Alliance (pronounced ah-lee-AHN-say from the Brazilian origin, but uh-LAHY-uhns in the American/English form) is one of the most prominent Brazilian jiu-jitsu associations and the current defending World team champion, having won the titles at the World Championships from 2008 to 2016. They also won the World Championships back to back in 1998 and 1999.  Alliance was founded by Romero "Jacare" Cavalcanti and his students: Fabio Gurgel, Alexandre Paiva, and Fernando Gurgel.  Alliance Global headquarters is in Atlanta, Georgia at the Alliance Martial Arts Academy, where "Jacare" is the head instructor.  Fabio Gurgel, also known as the "General", is the co-leader of Alliance and the head instructor at Alliance São Paulo (São Paulo, Brazil). Alexandre "Gigi" Paiva heads the third main Alliance academy in Rio de Janeiro, Brazil.

In 2010, Alliance won all major competitions: European Championship, Pan American Championship, and the World Jiu-Jitsu Championship; an accomplishment which has never been achieved by any other team in history.

History of Alliance 

Alliance was founded in 1993, by Romero Jacaré Cavalcanti, Fabio Gurgel, Alexandre Paiva and Fernando Gurgel.

Main titles:
 Thirteen times World champions - 1998, 1999, 2008, 2009, 2010, 2011, 2012, 2013, 2014, 2015, 2016, 2019, 2022
 National Brazilian champion in 2011
 National Brazilian champion in 2009
 Two times champion Rio Open in 2008 and 2009
 European champion 2010, 2011 and 2013

Notable black belts 

Romero "Jacare" Cavalcanti - Founders - 8th Degree Red / White Coral Belt & one of six Rolls Gracie black belts & Head Coach of Alliance in Atlanta
 Fabio "General" Gurgel - Founder & 4x IBJJF World Heavyweight Champion - 6th Degree Black Belt & Head Coach of Alliance in São Paulo
 Alexandre "Gigi" Paiva - Founder - IBJJF World Champion - 6th Degree Black Belt & Head Coach of Alliance in Rio de Janeiro
 Fernando "Terere" Augusto - 2x IBJJF World Middleweight Champion
 Rubens "Cobrinha" Charles Maciel - 4x IBJJF World Featherweight Champion/2x No Gi World Champ - 3X ADCC Submission Wrestling World Championship Winner
 Marcelo "Marcelinho" Garcia - 5x IBJJF World Middleweight Champion - 4X ADCC Submission Wrestling World Championship Winner
 Gabrielle Garcia - MMA Fighter - 6x IBJJF World Winner - 4x World Nogi Brazilian Jiu-Jitsu Championship Winner - 3X ADCC Submission Wrestling World Championship Winner
 Nei Seda - Multiple IBJJF Tournaments Medalist   and Alexandre "Gigi" Paiva first Black Belt - 5th Degree Black Belt & Head Coach of Alliance in Coral Springs - FL - Winner 
 Sergio "Serginho" Moraes - UFC Fighter and 2x IBJJF World Champion
 Felipe "Zicró" Neto - 2x Rio de Janeiro State Champion, Florida State Champion
 Luana Alzuguir 5x IBJJF World 1x ADCC Submission Wrestling World Championship Winner
 Rodrigo Damm - Ex UFC Fighter and Ultimate Fighter Brasil participant
 Tarsis Humphreys - 1x IBJJF World Medium/Heavy Champion
 Andresa Correa - 3x IBJJF World Winner - 3x World Nogi Brazilian Jiu-Jitsu Championship Winner
 Lucas Lepri - 9x IBJJF World Lightweight Champion/3x World Nogi Brazilian Jiu-Jitsu Championship Winner
 Mário Reis - 2x IBJJF World Featherweight Champion
 Michael Langhi - 3X IBJJF World Winner 1x World Nogi Brazilian Jiu-Jitsu Championship Winner
 Monique Elias 1x IBJJF World Winner
 Dominyka Obelenyte - 4x IBJJF World Winner
 Bruno Malfacine - 8x IBJJF World Roosterweight Champion
 Demian Maia - UFC Fighter, 2x UFC Title Challenger, 5X IBJJF World Winner and 1X ADCC Submission Wrestling World Championship Winner
 Matt Larsen - Creator of the US Army Combatives Program
 Bernardo Faria - 4x IBJJF World Champion
 Leo Nogueira - 3x IBJJF World Winner / Bronze ADCC Submission Wrestling World Championship Champion
 Polyana Lago Barbosa - 3x IBJJF World Middleweight Champion
 Tayane Porfírio - First Female "Grand Slam" black belt champion, 4x IBJJF World Winner
 Isaque Bahiense - 1x IBJJF World Winner, 1x IBJJF Europeans Winner
 Nicholas Meregali - 1x IBJJF World Winner, 1x Brazilian National Championship Winner
 Dimitrius Souza - 3x Brazilian National Championship Winner, 1x European Championship (Brazilian jiu-jitsu) Winner
 Fernando Di Piero “Soluço” - Multiple-time international medalist
 Matias Simonelli Multiple IBJJF Event Medallist and first Argentinian Black Belt under Mestre Fabio Gurgel
 Leo Leite
 Vicente Cavalcanti- Asian Open champion, Rome Open champion, 3x Pan Pacific champion, 3x Australian champion.
Andre Cury IBJJF Medallist-1st degree BJJ Black Belt under Luciano ( Casquinha ) Nucci one of the most remarkable BJJ black belts in Brazil
 Paulo Sergio Silva Dos Santos - 6th Degree BJJ Black belt, 2nd degree Judo blackbelt, 6x IBJJF World champion, 5x Brazilian National Championship Winner, 5x IBJJF Europeans winner
Allen Mohler-5th degree BJJ Black Belt
 Paul Walker - awarded posthumously by Ricardo "Franjinha" Miller at Paragon Jiu-Jitsu.

References

External links
Alliance BJJ Full History 
Alliance BJJ HQ
Alliance Sao Paulo
Alliance BJJ Academy MARanking profile Statistics and BJJ (GI) main titles since 2004

Brazilian jiu-jitsu organizations